Lafayette Gilchrist (born August 3, 1967) is an American jazz pianist and composer. As of January 2014, he lived in Baltimore. He has had a long association with saxophonist David Murray, with whom he has toured internationally.

Gilchrist leads an octet/nonet named the New Volcanoes, and a trio called Inside Out (with bassist Michael Formanek and drummer Eric Kennedy). Gilchrist acknowledges multiple influences on his music: "I come from hip-hop culture, [...] I'm not a rapper. I'm not a DJ. I'm not a dancer. But I feed off of all that. All of that's part of what I grew up in, what I grew up around."

Early life
Gilchrist was born in Washington, D.C. on August 3, 1967; he also grew up there. His mother, Janice Taylor Murdock, worked for the Federal Aviation Administration. As a child, "his musical interests were Stevie Wonder, The Jackson 5 and other soulful greats that flooded the airwaves of Black radio." Gilchrist's mother remarried when he was 14, at which point they moved to Prince George's County. He also enjoyed the local go-go at this time, and listened to Chuck Brown practicing near his aunt's home. Brown played jazz standards in a different style; Gilchrist observed that "it taught me that you can combine funk grooves and jazz".

In his late teens, Gilchrist took up boxing and considered joining the army, but was steered away from both by his stepfather. Gilchrist moved to Baltimore when he was 17, to study economics at the University of Maryland, Baltimore County. He started playing the piano at the same time – he stated that he started practicing in the piano rooms of his university after briefly playing the Steinway grand in its recital hall while a summer school student before beginning his degree. He taught himself to play and compose music, and received feedback on his compositions from music students. He graduated in 1992, with a BA in African-American studies.

Career
In 1993 Gilchrist formed the New Volcanoes, as a quartet that also contained trumpeter Freddie Dunn, bassist Vince Loving, and drummer Nate Reynolds. Trumpeter and sound engineer Mike Cerri was soon added, and Gilchrist recorded his first album, The Art Is Life, as a sextet with James Dephilipo added on euphonium. This was self-released, as was Gilchrist's second album, Asphalt Revolt. He played with the New Volcanoes and gave solo performances on the East Coast for several years after graduating.

He first met Murray in 1999: Gilchrist introduced himself and later sent the saxophonist a recording of his playing. They played together a few weeks later, and the pianist joined Murray's band after a few more weeks had passed. Their first gig together was at the Iridium Jazz Club in New York City in April 2000. Gilchrist subsequently obtained a recording contract with Hyena Records, but decided to remain in Baltimore, based on his belief that New York-based musicians tend to converge on a particular style of playing.

Gilchrist gradually built the sound of the New Volcanoes by adding particular musicians on different instruments, particularly Gabriel Ware on alto saxophone and Greg Thompkins on tenor. The latter commented that the pianist "does look at the horn section as a choir, [...] But it's a choir where anyone can get the spirit and take off". The first release of original material on Hyena was 2005's Towards the Shining Path, which received little attention, as Gilchrist did not have enough money to pay for the whole band to tour. To develop his reputation and capacity to tour, Gilchrist formed a more commercially viable band, a trio, with Anthony "Blue" Jenkins on bass and Reynolds on drums; they created the album Three.

Gilchrist's 2008 New Volcanoes album Soul Progressin'  received a four-star review from Down Beat, which commented that "Gilchrist's sanguine melodies, vulnerable and gospelized, distinguish the music from M-Base's cool austerity." A 2012 recording of the same group also contained a mix of styles: one reviewer described one track from It Came from Baltimore: Live at the Windup Space Vol. 1 as containing elements of "Pop and the avant-garde, old and new, free-jazz and funk, hip-hop and rock, modernist dissonance and sentimental grooves". Gilchrist also leads a trio called Inside Out, with Michael Formanek (bass) and Eric Kennedy (drums). Gilchrist's New Urban World Blues was a musical re-telling of the 2015 Baltimore uprising that began with the death of a young African American man and is chronicled in the song "Blues for Freddie Gray". A 4-volume set titled Compendium was released on Manta Ray Records in 2017.

His composition "Assume the Position" was used in the score for the HBO drama television series The Wire. His compositions have also been used in the HBO series Treme and The Deuce.

Playing style and influences
An NPR reviewer commented that Gilchrist's "two-handed piano [...] has techno and minimalism behind it. It's not just about the notes; it's also about the waves in which they come, and the troughs in between". Gilchrist himself indicated in 2007 that "I'm always seeking a dialogue between popular rhythms and the improvising process [...] For me to make personal music, I have to come out of the music I grew up with and love, and that's hip-hop and go-go."

Composing style
Gilchrist has stated that his compositions for the New Volcanoes "build from small things to big things, from settlements to villages to cities; I never start with the whole city. [...] That's what we're all about: breaking the music up in the middle and then re-gathering the pieces". Following the approach of Duke Ellington, Gilchrist prefers to compose pieces for specific members of his band, instead of for particular instruments. In 2007, he commented on the political element of his compositions: "everything I write about, in my music, has a political slant to it. It comes from basically a very, very disturbed young black man. And at times angry, furious. But if that anger doesn't have a spiritual dimension, you're going to be in a lot of trouble".

Discography
An asterisk (*) indicates that the year is that of release.

As leader

As sideman

Main sources:

External links

References

American jazz pianists
American male pianists
1967 births
Living people
20th-century American pianists
21st-century American pianists
20th-century American male musicians
21st-century American male musicians
American male jazz musicians